The 2018 season was FC Vorkuta's second season in the Canadian Soccer League. The club ended their CSL campaign with a club record by securing their first professional championship title in the First Division, and the double in the Second Division. The club qualified for the playoffs for the second consecutive season after finishing second in the First Division. In the postseason Vorkuta defeated the likes of Real Mississauga, and SC Waterloo Region in order to reach the championship final. Their opposition in the finals were Scarborough SC, where Vorkuta claimed their first CSL Championship after a victory in a penalty shootout.

While in the Second Division their reserve team clinched the organization's first division title, and made further achievements in the postseason after winning the championship title against Halton United. The club's top goalscorer for the second consecutive season was Sergiy Ivliev with eleven goals.

Summary  
In preparation for the 2018 season the organization selected Denys Yanchuk as the general manager, while Samad Kadirov returned to manage the team. The club continued in recruiting imports from the Ukrainian football market, while retaining their core veterans from the previous season. Their sophomore year within the league produced another successful season by finishing second in the First Division with only a goal differential with FC Ukraine United to separate them from clinching the title. In the opening round of the postseason Vorkuta defeated Real Mississauga, and then followed by a victory over SC Waterloo Region to place them in the championship final. In the finals Vorkuta faced Scarborough SC, and made club history by winning their first CSL Championship in a 6–5 victory in a penalty shootout.

Meanwhile, in the Second Division their reserve team clinched the organization's first division title, and made further history after winning the championship title against Halton United.

Team

Roster

Management

Transfers

In

Competitions

Preseason

Canadian Soccer League

First Division

Results summary

Results by round

Matches

Postseason

Second Division

Results summary

Results by round

Matches

Postseason

Statistics

Goals and assists 
Correct as of October 13, 2018

References 

FC Vorkuta seasons
FC Vorkuta
FC Vorkuta
FC Vorkuta